RailRunner can refer to:
 New Mexico Rail Runner Express
 RailRunner (company) Inc.
 Railrunner - ticket in the Netherlands